Stenanthemum emarginatum is a species of flowering plant in the family Rhamnaceae and is endemic to the southwest of Western Australia. It is a spreading to prostrate shrub with sparsely hairy young stems, narrowly fan-shaped to linear leaves and densely, shaggy-hairy heads of white or cream-coloured flowers.

Description
The upper surface of the leaves is glabrous and the lower surface is covered with shaggy, silvery hairs. The flowers are sparsely to densely covered with shaggy, greyish hairs.

Taxonomy and naming
Stenanthemum emarginatum was first formally described in 1995 by Barbara Lynette Rye in the journal Nuytsia from specimens collected by Alex George near Ravensthorpe in 1960. The specific epithet (emarginatum) means "notched", referring to the leaves.

Distribution and habitat
This species grows in shrubland and mallee-heath between Gingin and Hopetoun in the Avon Wheatbelt, Esperance Plains, Geraldton Sandplains, Jarrah Forest and Swan Coastal Plain bioregions of south-western Western Australia.

Conservation status
Stenanthemum emarginatum is listed as "not threatened" by the Government of Western Australia Department of Biodiversity, Conservation and Attractions.

References

emarginatum
Rosales of Australia
Flora of Western Australia
Plants described in 1995
Taxa named by Barbara Lynette Rye